Sean Campbell (born April 11, 1973 in Victoria, British Columbia) is a field hockey player from Canada, who earned his first international cap at the 1999 Sultan Azlan Shah Tournament in Kuala Lumpur, Malaysia.

International senior competitions
 1999 - Sultan Azlan Shah Cup, Kuala Lumpur (4th)
 1999 - Pan American Games, Winnipeg (1st)
 2000 - Sultan Azlan Shah Cup, Kuala Lumpur (7th)
 2000 - Americas Cup, Cuba (2nd)
 2000 - Olympic Games, Sydney (10th)
 2001 - World Cup Qualifier, Edinburgh (8th)
 2002 - Commonwealth Games, Manchester (6th)
 2004 - Olympic Qualifying Tournament, Madrid (11th)
 2004 - Pan Am Cup, London (2nd)

External links

 Profile

1973 births
Living people
Field hockey players from Victoria, British Columbia
Canadian male field hockey players
Field hockey players at the 2000 Summer Olympics
Olympic field hockey players of Canada
Pan American Games gold medalists for Canada
Pan American Games medalists in field hockey
Field hockey players at the 1999 Pan American Games
Medalists at the 1999 Pan American Games
Field hockey players at the 2002 Commonwealth Games
Commonwealth Games competitors for Canada